Duisburg Hauptbahnhof is a railway station in the city of Duisburg in western Germany. It is situated at the meeting point of many important national and international railway lines in the Northwestern Ruhr valley.

Lines 
The station is situated at the northern end of the relatively straight Duisburg to Düsseldorf railway line which has to cope with one of the highest daily loads in continental Europe. This line is slated to be widened to six tracks in the near future. Currently it has four—and in some places five—tracks. Parallel to it to the east is the local line to Duisburg-Wedau, remnant of a relief line to Düsseldorf which only sees a local shuttle service today but is heavily used by freight trains (which usually do not run through the station but bypass it on a freight-only line two miles to the east). The third line from the south is the railway line to Krefeld and Mönchengladbach. This crosses the River Rhine and then splits into the main line and a branch to Moers and Xanten at Rheinhausen. North of the station, seven tracks run to the River Ruhr crossing (which is a sight on the Route der Industriekultur (Route of industrial heritage) due to a maze of girder bridges) where a three track line split for Oberhausen and on to Arnhem and the other line runs to Dortmund via Gelsenkirchen. The four-tracked main line turns east and runs via Essen and Bochum to Dortmund.

Operational usage

Railway 
The station is an important hub for InterCityExpress, InterCity and EuroCity trains from and to the Netherlands, Berlin, Switzerland, Munich, Frankfurt and Cologne. It also is an important connection point for RegionalExpress and RegionalBahn lines and has two S-Bahn lines of the Rhein-Ruhr S-Bahn calling at the station. A nearby Stadtbahn station offers local connections as well as trams to Mülheim an der Ruhr and Düsseldorf.

Local travel 

Trams and buses call at the northern concourse (not connected to the main hall). There is another bus station at the eastern end of the main concourse, but not all lines serving the station call there. Taxis are available at both ends of the main concourse. The station is directly connected to the motorway A59, which runs under the plaza in front of the main entrance. Long-distance coaches depart from a small bus station at the city end of the station (behind the taxi ranks, to the left).

Architecture 
The current station building dates from the 1930s and was modelled after the station in Königsberg. After WW2 it was extensively rebuilt and many features (such as murals in the main concourse) were lost. Its 6 platforms are covered by a train shed at their southern ends and modern canopies to the north where there is a second concourse housing the bus and tram stops.

The station today has a rather drab feeling with the train shed in need of repair as there are quite a number of holes in the roof. Work to replace the roof and platforms commenced in August 2022, starting with tracks 12 and 13. This work is expected to take several years

Amenities 
As is usual with station of its size, Duisburg Hbf has a number of shops on its concourse and in the main hall. These include a book shop, a barber shop, several telecommunication accessories dealers, 2 bars, a small gambling arcade and several bakers and fast food stalls. The booking hall is located in the main hall (city exit), and lockers are provided at the beginning of the concourse to the right, next to the toilets. In the station building outside the concourse there is a hotel and local newspaper offices, and there used to be a fairly large night club which closed in early 2006 and has remained empty since.

History

Former private railways
Duisburg station was opened in Duisburg on 9 February 1846 by the Cologne-Minden Railway Company (Cöln-Mindener Eisenbahn-Gesellschaft, CME) along with the second section of its trunk line from Cologne-Deutz to Minden. On 15 May 1847 the line was extended to Hamm and Duisburg station became a through station on the line from Düsseldorf to Oberhausen.

Fifteen years later, in 1862, the Bergisch-Märkische Railway Company (Bergisch-Märkische Eisenbahn-Gesellschaft, BME), opened its east–west route through the Ruhr region from Dortmund and Witten to Duisburg. Its station was built close to the existing station, but it was a terminal station that was approached only from the northeast, not a through station.

Finally, on 15 February 1870, a three kilometre long branch line was opened by the Rhenish Railway Company (Rheinische Eisenbahn-Gesellschaft, RHE) from the Rheinhausen–Hochfeld train ferry to Duisburg, which became the starting point of its new route to Quakenbrück, completed in 1879. It built a through station next to other stations in Duisburg.

Prussian state railways
The station buildings of the three railway companies survived until after their nationalisation when they became part of the Prussian state railways. In the 1880s the three stations were demolished and a joint station building was built on an island between the platforms of the various lines.

The entrance to this building was to the north on Mülheimer Straße, which the lines crossed at that time over level crossings. It was not until the late 19th and early 20th centuries that all tracks had been raised above street level.

Deutsche Reichsbahn

At the beginning of the 1930s, the station, which had been taken over Deutsche Reichsbahn in 1920 when it absorbed the Prussian State Railway, was extended and rebuilt to its present size. The buildings have since been replaced.

The still-existing entrance building of the station at Portsmouthplatz was built from 1931 to 1934 under the direction of the government architect Johannes Ziertmann (an architect at the railway division of Essen) and was considered one of the most modern station buildings of its time. It is comparable with the entrance buildings in Düsseldorf and Oberhausen, built in the same period. The two sculptures at the front of a steel frame structure built for the ticket hall are by the Essen sculptor Joseph Enseling. The platform canopies were built with Vierendeel trusses and are structurally similar to the canopies at Düsseldorf Hauptbahnhof, which were scrapped in the 1980s, and follow the conceptually similar canopies of Darmstadt Hauptbahnhof built before the First World War. The Duisburg platform canopies were the first all-welded steel construction of this size.

During the Second World War the station was heavily damaged in a heavy bombing attack on Duisburg by allied forces.

Deutsche Bundesbahn
The station has been rebuilt several times since the war. In 1992, as part of the inauguration of the Duisburg Stadtbahn (light rail), the new northern connecting hall (Verknüpfungshalle) was opened, all six platforms were lengthened to several hundred metres over the former road underpass connecting Mühlheimerstraße and Königstraße and provided with simple platform roofs, which are easily distinguished from the old station hall.

Deutsche Bahn

On 12 December 2008 Deutsche Bahn and the state of North Rhine-Westphalia announced that much-needed renovation work would begin in mid of 2009. The total cost was estimated at €60 million. The first phase includes the renovation of the lobby and the underpass. Among other things, the false ceilings would be removed and the building returned to its original state. Renovation work on the monumental facade is planned. The cost for the first phase is estimated at €10.1 million.

On 24 July 2009, the first phase of renovation work began and the major renovations in the entrance hall were completed on 22 December 2009. From January 2010 work started on the renovation of the pedestrian tunnel. In a second, much more expensive construction phase, the railway platforms, railway tracks and the dilapidated roof were due to be rehabilitated in 2011. However work on the roof and platforms only commenced in August 2022, with the first two platforms to be completed during 2023

Train services
The station is served by the following services:

Long distance

Regional
Regional services  NRW-Express Aachen - Cologne - Düsseldorf - Duisburg - Essen - Dortmund - Hamm
Regional services  Rhein-Haard-Express Münster - Dülmen - Recklinghausen - Essen - Duisburg - Düsseldorf
Regional services  Rhein-Emscher-Express Hamm - Dortmund - Gelsenkirchen - Duisburg - Düsseldorf
Regional services  Rhein-Express Wesel - Oberhausen - Duisburg - Düsseldorf - Cologne - Bonn - Koblenz
Regional services  Rhein-Weser-Express Minden - Bielefeld - Hamm - Dortmund - Essen - Duisburg - Düsseldorf - Neuss - Cologne - Cologne/Bonn Airport
Regional services  Rhein-Hellweg-Express Kassel - Paderborn - Hamm - Dortmund - Essen - Duisburg - Düsseldorf
Regional services  Rhein-IJssel-Express Arnhem - Emmerich - Wesel - Oberhausen - Duisburg - Düsseldorf
Regional services  Niers-Haard-Express Münster - Dülmen - Recklinghausen - Essen - Duisburg - Krefeld - Mönchengladbach
Regional services  Fossa-Emscher-Express: Moers – Rheinhausen – Duisburg – Oberhausen – Bottrop
Local services  Niederrheinstrecke Xanten - (Kamp-Lintfort Süd Landesgartenschau 2020) Moers - Duisburg
Local services  Rhein-Emscher-Bahn Dortmund - Gelsenkirchen - Wanne-Eickel - Duisburg
Local services  Rhein-Niers-Bahn Essen – Duisburg - Krefeld - Mönchengladbach - Aachen
Local services  Emscher-Niederrhein-Bahn Gelsenkirchen - Oberhausen - Duisburg - Krefeld - Mönchengladbach
Rhein-Ruhr S-Bahn services  Solingen - Düsseldorf - Duisburg - Essen - Dortmund

Notes

External links 

 
 
 
 

Railway stations in North Rhine-Westphalia
S1 (Rhine-Ruhr S-Bahn)
S2 (Rhine-Ruhr S-Bahn)
Buildings and structures in Duisburg
Transport in Duisburg
Rhine-Ruhr S-Bahn stations
Railway stations in Germany opened in 1846
1846 establishments in Prussia